Walter A. Haas Sr. (May 11, 1889 – December 7, 1979), was an American billionaire businessman who was the president and chairman of Levi Strauss & Co.

Early life and education
Haas was born to a Jewish family, one of four children of Abraham Haas and Fanny Koshland. His father was an immigrant from Bavaria who founded the Hellman, Haas and Company which eventually became the Smart & Final grocery store chain. His mother was the daughter of Simon Koshland, one of the most successful wool merchants in San Francisco. His siblings were Charles, Ruth (1891), and Eleanor (1900).

In 1910, Haas graduated from the University of California, Berkeley, where he was a member of the Order of the Golden Bear.

Haas served in the U.S. Army Field Artillery during World War I.

Career
Upon his return to the United States in 1919, he worked at the Levi Strauss & Company, then a small dry goods wholesaler and maker of work clothing, owned by the family of his wife. In 1928, he became president and served in that position until 1955; thereafter, he served as chairman until 1970 and remained active in company affairs until his death in 1979. Haas' tenure and dedication at Levi Strauss – along with that of his business partner and brother-in-law Daniel E. Koshland Sr. – is widely credited with "saving" the company, leading it through the Great Depression, racial integration at its factories, the global popularization of the Levi brand, and the creation of the Levi Strauss Foundation.

Politics and philanthropy
A Republican, he was an alternate delegate to the 1952 Republican National Convention.  He was Jewish, and served as president of the San Francisco Jewish Welfare Federation.

Personal life
In 1914, Haas married Elise Stern, daughter of Sigmund Stern, the son of David Stern and the nephew of Levi Strauss (Strauss had died unmarried and without children and deeded his company to his four nephews). Haas had three children: Rhoda Haas Goldman, Peter E. Haas, and Walter A. Haas Jr.

In 1989, the University of California, Berkeley Regents voted to rename the business school the Haas School of Business in his honor, after a large gift from the Haas family.

References

 Who's Who in America 1964

1889 births
1979 deaths
Jewish American philanthropists
Businesspeople from California
Haas School of Business alumni
Haas family
Businesspeople from the San Francisco Bay Area
Levi Strauss & Co. people
Lowell High School (San Francisco) alumni
Koshland family